The name Marge has been used for 12 tropical cyclones in the Northwest Pacific Ocean.

 Tropical Storm Marge (1945)
 Typhoon Marge (1951)
 Typhoon Marge (1955)
 Tropical Storm Marge (1962)
 Tropical Storm Marge (1964)
 Typhoon Marge (1967)
 Tropical Storm Marge (1970)
 Typhoon Marge (1973)
 Tropical Storm Marge (1976)
 Typhoon Marge (1980)
 Typhoon Marge (1983)
 Typhoon Marge (1986)

Marge